Ricardo Moyano is an Argentinian musician and composer. Son of Irma Capellino and Daniel Moyano, born in La Rioja, Argentina, in 1961. He has lived and worked in various countries, which has influenced the formation of his style. Playing with his friends as musicians has been and remains the preferred and main source of inspiration. Alongside his concert career he has recorded in various countries, alone and with other musicians. He lives in Istanbul and works as a guitar teacher at Yildiz University. He has a YouTube channel on which he uploads various recordings.

Recordings
Ricardo Moyano en Japon, 2016, Japan.
Musics of Rio de la Plata vol.1, 2013, Turkey  – Old tango, waltz and milonga, with Gustavo Battistessa (bandoneón).
El Aveloriado, France, 1994
Voyage en Amériques, France, 1996
Marinés, Turkey, 1997
Bésame mucho, Argentina, 1999
YimYum, Internet, 2000
Guitarist, Turkey, 2005
Solissimo, Turkey, 2006
El Chelco, Spain, 2008
El Trino del Diablo, Germany, 1999, with Carlo Domeniconi
Encuentros y Soledades (Argentina, with Juan Falu)
Tango Primeur (France, 1990, with Cuarteto Cedron)
Los Tiempos Cambian (France, 1995, with Jorge Cumbo)
Cousins (France, 2006)
Musica Criolla (France, 1996, with Guillermo de la Roca)
Hands and Lips (Turkey, 1994, as a guest of Kerem Görsev)
La Saveur de la Terre, France, 1992 (with Juan Falu)
Encuentros y Soledades, Argentina, 1998 (with Juan Falu)
Los Tiempos Cambian Francia, 1996, with Jorge Cumbo (quena, siku) and Gerardo di Giusto (piano)
Trío con Guillermo de la Roca (quena, flautas) y Esteban Cáceres (guitarra, bombo, charango)
Música Criolla Francia, 1990
Ladino Latino, France, 2005, with [Liat Cohen]
Orquesta de Camara de Guitarras de Masdrid, Spain, 1982 (dir. Jorge Cardoso)

Dúo de guitarras con Joseph Lipomi
Gadjo Latino Francia 2006

Trío con Nabil Khalidi (laúd) y Liat Cohen (guitarra)
(LiRicNa Trío)
Cousins Francia 2006

Orquesta de Guitarras de Madrid, Spain, 1982

Con Indio Juan (poesías)
Instantes y Olas, Spain, 1984
with Justine B (canto y guitarra) en preparación... España, 2009

Other Collaborations 
With Jorge Cardoso (dúos de guitarra), with Juan Falú (ídem), y as a soloist:
Festival de Alsace 1992  			Francia,		1994
Internationales Gitarrenfestivalen 	Germany,		1994
Guitarras del Mundo  ‘95		Argentina,		1996
Guitarras del Mundo  ’98		Argentina,		1998
Diez Años (antología de Juan Falu)	Argentina,		1997

Antología de guitarristas:
Contrastes				Francia, 		1992
Paderborn Guitarfestival		Alemania,		199...

With Tierra del Fuego (tango-jazz)
Tierra del Fuego,  Sexteto		Francia,		1989
Viejo, Solo y Borracho			Francia,		1995

With Kerem Görsev  (pianista de jazz)

Hands and Lips				Turquía,  		1997

As a guest musician :

For Murat				Turquía,   		1998
With Gabriel Rivano  (tangos...)
Tradición				Argentina, 		1999
With Hümeyra,  (actriz y cantante turca) Beyhude		Turquía, 		1998
With Joshemaria   (cantante argentino) Romántico y Latino	Argentina, 		199...
With Liliana Rodríguez  (cantante Argentina)
Tangos Valses y Milongas 		Francia, 		2006
With Osvaldo Burucua (música Argentina)	Violeros		Argentina		2005

Never edited :
Begamoy Trío, France, 2006, with Gustavo Beytelmann (piano) and Minino Garay (percussion)
Gato por Liebre, Argentina, 1997, with Gabriel Rivano (bandoneón)

References

Argentine classical guitarists
Argentine male guitarists
1961 births
Living people
Argentine expatriates in Turkey
People from La Rioja Province, Argentina
Argentine composers